The Tamrau Mountains, also known as the Tambrauw Mountains or the Tamarau Mountains, is a mountain range located in the north central region of the Bird's Head Peninsula in the province of West Papua. It is made up of an isolated and lesser continuous mountain chain compared to the Arfak Mountains. The Tamrau and Arfak Mountains are both divided by the grassy Kebar Valley, which is the heartland of many indigenous people, with a variety of backgrounds. The Tamrau Mountains have been very scantily surveyed for any purpose till this day. The mountains are an important and threatened site of biodiversity, part of the Vogelkop montane rain forests ecoregion.

References
WWF Bird Watching on Bird's Head, and the Threats to the Region Vogelkop Montane Rain Forests. Accessed 5 March 2015
Arfak Mountains: Birding Hotspot of West Papua Accessed 5 March 2015

Mountain ranges of Indonesia
Landforms of Western New Guinea
Landforms of West Papua (province)